Pasquale D'Aniello (born 16 December 1985) is an Italian footballer who plays as a defender for F.C. Turris 1944 A.S.D.

External links
 
 laseried.com

1985 births
Italian footballers
Living people
Bologna F.C. 1909 players
Spezia Calcio players
A.S.D. Victor San Marino players
Olbia Calcio 1905 players
U.S. Alessandria Calcio 1912 players
A.S.D. Olimpia Colligiana players
Association football defenders